Walnut Bend may refer to:
Walnut Bend, Houston, a subdivision in Houston, Harris County, Texas
Walnut Bend, Texas, an unincorporated community in Cooke County, Texas
Walnut Bend Independent School District, a public school district in Cooke County, Texas